The People in Your Neighbourhood is the sixth studio album by British jazz band Led Bib. It was released in May 2014 under Cuneiform Records.

Track listing

References

2014 albums
Led Bib albums
Cuneiform Records albums